Talison Minerals Pty Ltd was a mining company based in Australia. It was split into Talison Lithium (as of 2020 a 51:49 jv between Tianqi Lithium and Albemarle Corporation) and  Talison Tantalum, now known as Global Advanced Metals, in 2009. The two largest mining operations of the company were the Greenbushes mine near Greenbushes, Western Australia and Wodgina, Pilbara Region, Western Australia.

References

External links

 
 
Talison Lithium Ltd. website

Mining companies of Australia
Companies based in Western Australia
Metal companies of Australia
Lithium mining